The ICC Associates Triangular Series in the West Indies in 2006/07 was a three-match series involving Bangladesh, Bermuda and Canada. It was a warm-up tournament for the 2007 Cricket World Cup.

Matches

1st Match

2nd Match

3rd Match

Standings

See also
Other triangular series featuring ICC associate members:

 Associates Triangular Series in Kenya in 2006–07
 Associates Triangular Series in South Africa in 2006–07
 Dubai Triangular Series 2014–15

References

External links
Cricket Archive's Tournament Page

International cricket competitions in 2006–07